"Nobody but Me" is a song by Canadian recording artist Michael Bublé, featuring American rapper Black Thought from the group The Roots. It was released on August 9, 2016 through Reprise Records as the lead single from his seventh studio album of the same name.

Music video
A lyric video premiered on Bublé's YouTube channel on August 18, 2016. The official music video followed afterwards on October 11, 2016. The video takes inspiration from the 1960s show The Dating Game, with Bublé playing all three eligible bachelors: a glasses-wearing nerd, a narcissistic ladies man sporting bell-bottom trousers and sideburns, and a beatnik, beret-wearing French man.

Charts

Weekly charts

Year-end charts

References

2016 singles
Michael Bublé songs
Reprise Records singles
Songs written by Michael Bublé